East Arm may also refer to:

East Arm, Antarctica, a geological feature on the Antarctica.
East Arm, Northern Territory, a suburb in Australia
East Arm Dolomite, a geological formation  in Canada

See also

East Arm Little Calumet River

East Bay (disambiguation)
East (disambiguation)
Arm (disambiguation)